Nigeria has competed at every edition of the African Games. Its athletes have won a total of 1326 medals.

Medals by Games

Below is a table representing all medals across the Games in which it has competed.

See also 
 Nigeria at the Olympics
 Nigeria at the Paralympics
 Sports in Nigeria

References

External links 
 All-Africa Games index - todor66.com